Sports Desk may refer to:

 Sports Desk (Philippine TV program), a Philippine sports television program that has aired on various channels since 2007
 Scotsport, a Scottish sports television program shown on STV

See also
SportsDesk